Fight to Win is an album by Nigerian musician Femi Kuti that was released in mid-October 2001.

Track listing

 "Do Your Best (ft. Mos Def)"
 "Walk on the Right Side"
 "Traitors of Africa"
 "Tension Grip Nigeria"
 "'97"
 "Fight to Win (ft. Jaguar Wright)"
 "Stop AIDS"
 "Eko Lagos"
 "Alkebu-Lan (Cradle of Civilization)"
 "One Day Someday"
 "The Choice Is Yours"
 "Missing Link (ft. Common)"

References 

2001 albums
Afrobeat albums
Femi Kuti albums